Palvanniyaz Khodja Yusupov - (Khiva 1861 - 1936.14.5) - representative of Jadidism in Khorezm, statesman.
Palvanniyaz Khodja Yusupov was born in Khiva in 1861. He graduated from school and madrasa. He was engaged in trade. Fluent in Arabic and Russian.
In 1914, he headed the left wing of the Jadids, who stood in opposition to the Khiva khan Asfandiyar Khan. In April 1917, the Jadids presented to Asfandiyar Khan a project of reforms, one of the authors of which was Palvanniyaz Khodja Yusupov. Since 1917, he was forced to leave Khorezm and lived in exile in Tashkent. After the fall of the power of the Uzbek dynasty of Kungrats in February 1920, the Khorezm People's Soviet Republic was created, the Chairman of the Council of which was Palvanniyaz Khodja Yusupov. He held this post from April 27, 1920 to March 6, 1921. Then he held other government posts.

References 

 Matkarimov M., Xorazm Respublikasi: davlat tuzilishi, nozirlari va iqtisodi, Urganch, 1993.

1861 births
1936 deaths
History of Central Asia
Uzbeks
Jadids